Marc Collat (born 24 May 1950) is a Martinican-French professional football former player who is the head coach of Martinique.

References

1950 births
Living people
Sportspeople from Fort-de-France
Martiniquais footballers
Martiniquais people of Indian descent
French footballers
French people of Martiniquais descent
French people of Indian descent
Association football defenders
Racing Club de France Football players
Stade Français (association football) players
Martiniquais football managers
Martiniquais expatriate football managers
Martiniquais expatriate sportspeople in Mauritius
Martiniquais expatriate sportspeople in Haiti
French football managers
French expatriate football managers
French expatriate sportspeople in Mauritius
US Créteil-Lusitanos managers
Stade de Reims managers
Clermont Foot managers
Mauritius national football team managers
Haiti national football team managers
Martinique national football team managers
2015 CONCACAF Gold Cup managers
2019 CONCACAF Gold Cup managers
USM Malakoff (football) players
French expatriate sportspeople in Haiti